Knut Henning Andresen (born 2 June 1959) is a former Norwegian ice hockey player. He was born in Asker. He played for the Norwegian national ice hockey team at the 1980 Winter Olympics.

References

External links
 
 
 

1959 births
Living people
People from Asker
Norwegian ice hockey players
Olympic ice hockey players of Norway
Ice hockey players at the 1980 Winter Olympics
Sportspeople from Viken (county)